Youssef Hajdi, born June 8, 1979 in Tarascon, is a French actor.

Biography
Born in Tarascon in Bouches-du-Rhône to Moroccan parents, he grew up in Beaucaire. He went to Paris at age 20, where he worked in cafe-theatre and at the théâtre de l’Avancée. Then from 2002 to 2005, he studied acting with Jack Waltzer, a lifetime member of the Actors Studio.

His first film role was in 13 m² by Barthélémy Grossmann, which earned him a 2008 nomination for the Césars award in 2008. He acted in Les Aventures extraordinaires d'Adèle Blanc-Sec by Luc Besson and in Micmacs à tire-larigot by Jean-Pierre Jeunet. In 2012, he joined Omar Sy and Laurent Lafitte in De l'autre côté du périph, a film by David Charhon. As well, he appeared with Éric Judor in the film Mohamed Dubois by Ernesto Ona in 2013.

In 2014, he acted in La Dernière Échappée, a film by Fabien Onteniente, in which Hajdi played Eddy Clavel, a doctor who treated Laurent Fignon (Samuel Le Bihan). In 2015, he did voice acting for the animated film Pourquoi j'ai pas mangé mon père by  Jamel Debbouze.

Filmography

Films 

 2007 : Truands by Frédéric Schoendoerffer 
 2007 : 13 m² by Barthélémy Grossmann 
 2007 : L'invité by Laurent Bouhnik 
 2008 : La Première Étoile by Lucien Jean-Baptiste 
 2008 : Black by Pierre Laffargue 
 2009 : Micmacs à tire-larigot by Jean-Pierre Jeunet 
 2010 : Les Aventures extraordinaires d'Adèle Blanc-Sec by Luc Besson
 2011 : Halal police d'État by Rachid Dhibou 
 2011 : La Ligne droite by Régis Wargnier 
 2011 : Low Cost by Maurice Barthélémy 
 2011 : Les Hommes libres by Ismaël Ferroukhi 
 2012 : De l'autre côté du périph by David Charhon 
 2013 : Mohamed Dubois by Ernesto Ona 
 2013 : Gibraltar by Julien Leclercq 
 2013 : Au bonheur des ogres by Nicolas Bary 
 2014 : Vincent n'a pas d'écailles by Thomas Salvador 
 2014 : Tête baissée by Kamen Kalev 
 2015 : Les Nouvelles Aventures d'Aladin by Arthur Benzaquen 
 2015 : Braqueurs by Julien Leclercq 
 2017 : Problemos by Éric Judor  
 2018 : Larguées by Éloïse Lang 
 2018 : Pupille by Jeanne Herry 
 2019 : Le Daim by Quentin Dupieux 
 2019 : Damien veut changer le monde by Xavier de Choudens 
 2019 : Bêtes blondes by Maxime Matray, Alexia Walther 
 2019 : Divorce Club by Michaël Youn 
 2019 : C'est la vie by Julien Rambaldi
 2022 : Bigbug by Jean-Pierre Jeunet

External links 
 Youssef Hajdi on CinéArtistes

References

French male actors
1979 births
Living people
People from Tarascon